The following lists events that happened during 1969 in Cape Verde.

Incumbents
Colonial governor:
Leão Maria Tavares Rosado do Sacramento Monteiro
António Adriano Faria Lopes dos Santos

Events

Sports
CS Mindelense won the Cape Verdean Football Championship

References

 
1969 in the Portuguese Empire
Years of the 20th century in Cape Verde
1960s in Cape Verde
Cape Verde
Cape Verde